Francisco Largo Caballero (15 October 1869 – 23 March 1946) was a Spanish politician and trade unionist. He was one of the historic leaders of the Spanish Socialist Workers' Party (PSOE) and of the Workers' General Union (UGT). In 1936 and 1937 Caballero served as the Prime Minister of the Second Spanish Republic during the Spanish Civil War.

Biography

Early years 
Born in Madrid, as a young man he made his living stuccoing walls. He participated in a construction workers strike in 1890 and joined the PSOE in 1894. Upon the death in 1925 of party founder Pablo Iglesias, he succeeded him as head of the party and of the UGT.

Political career 
Moderate in his positions at the beginning of his political life, he advocated maintaining a degree of UGT cooperation with the dictatorial government of General Miguel Primo de Rivera, which permitted the union to continue functioning under his military dictatorship (that lasted from 1923 to 1930). This was the start of his political conflict with Indalecio Prieto, who opposed all collaboration with the dictatorial regime.

He was Minister of Labor Relations between 1931 and 1933, in the first governments of the Second Spanish Republic, headed by Niceto Alcalá-Zamora, and in that of his successor Manuel Azaña. Caballero attempted to improve the conditions of landless labourers (braceros) in the rural south. On 28 April 1931 he introduced a decree of municipal boundaries to prevent the importation of foreign labour while there remained unemployed workers within the municipality. In May he established mixed juries (jurados mixtos) to arbitrate in agrarian labour disputes, and introduced an eight-hour working day in the countryside. Alongside these, a decree on obligatory cultivation prevented owners from using their land however they wanted. He enjoyed great popularity among the masses of workers, who saw their own austere existences reflected in his way of life.

In the elections of 19 November 1933, the right-wing Spanish Confederation of the Autonomous Right (CEDA) won power in Spain. The government nominally led by the centrist Radical Alejandro Lerroux was dependent on CEDA's parliamentary support. Responding to this reversal of fortune, Largo abandoned his moderate positions, began to talk of "socialist revolution", and became the leader of the left (Marxist and revolutionary) wing of the UGT and the PSOE. In early October 1934, after three CEDA ministers entered the government, he was one of the leaders of the failed armed rising of workers (mainly in Asturias) which was forcefully put down by the CEDA-dominated government.

He defended the pact of alliance with the other workers' political parties and trade unions, such as the Communist Party of Spain (PCE) and the anarchist trade union, the Confederacion Nacional del Trabajo (CNT). Once again, this placed him at odds with Prieto. He declared, that he, Largo Caballero "shall be the second Lenin", whose aim is the union of Iberian Soviet republics.
 
After the Popular Front won the elections in February 1936, president Manuel Azaña proposed that Prieto join the government, but Largo blocked these attempts at collaboration between PSOE and the Republican government. Largo dismissed fears of a military coup, and predicted that, were it to happen, a general strike would defeat it, opening the door to the workers' revolution.

In the event, the coup attempt by the colonial army and the right came on 17 July 1936. While not immediately successful, further actions by rebellious army units sparked the Spanish Civil War (1936–1939), in which the republic was ultimately defeated and destroyed.

Prime Minister of Spain 

On 4 September 1936, a few months into the civil war, Largo Caballero was designated Prime Minister and Minister of War. Besides conducting the war, he also focused on maintaining military discipline and government authority within the Republic. On 4 November 1936 Largo Caballero persuaded the anarchist Confederación Nacional del Trabajo (CNT; "National Confederation of Labour") to join the government, with four members assigned to junior ministries including Justice, Health and Trade. The decision was controversial with the CNT members.

The Barcelona May Days led to a governmental crisis that forced Caballero to resign on 17 May 1937. Juan Negrín, also a member of the PSOE, was appointed Prime Minister in his stead.

The cabinet, formed on 4 September 1936 and reshuffled on 4 November 1936, consisted of:

Exile, death, and legacy 
Upon the defeat of the Republic in 1939, he fled to France. Arrested during the German occupation of France, he spent most of World War II imprisoned in the Sachsenhausen-Oranienburg concentration camp, until the liberation of the camps at the end of the war.

He died in exile in Paris in 1946; his remains were returned to Madrid in 1978 after Franco's death in 1975.

See also
Moscow gold
Marcelino Valentín Gamazo

Footnotes

Sources

External links
Documents on Caballero from "Trabajadores: The Spanish Civil War through the eyes of organised labour", a digitised collection of more than 13,000 pages of documents from the archives of the British Trades Union Congress held in the Modern Records Centre, University of Warwick
Andy Durgan The Rise and Fall of Largo Cabellero, International Socialism, 18 (1983)
 http://www.geneall.net/H/per_page.php?id=467749
 

1869 births
1946 deaths
Politicians from Madrid
Spanish Socialist Workers' Party politicians
Prime Ministers of Spain
Members of the Congress of Deputies of the Spanish Restoration
Members of the Congress of Deputies of the Second Spanish Republic
Unión General de Trabajadores members
Spanish people of the Spanish Civil War (Republican faction)
Exiles of the Spanish Civil War in France
Spanish revolutionaries
Members of the Executive of the Labour and Socialist International
Sachsenhausen concentration camp survivors
Burials at Père Lachaise Cemetery
Defence ministers of Spain
Madrid city councillors
Spanish people imprisoned abroad
Exiled Spanish politicians
Government ministers during the Second Spanish Republic